Korovino is the name of several  rural localities in Russia.

Belgorod Oblast
As of 2010, three rural localities in Belgorod Oblast bear this name:
Korovino, Rakityansky District, Belgorod Oblast, a selo in Dmitriyevsky Rural Okrug of Rakityansky District
Korovino, Shebekinsky District, Belgorod Oblast, a selo in Shebekinsky District
Korovino, Volokonovsky District, Belgorod Oblast, a selo in Staroivanovsky Rural Okrug of Volokonovsky District

Chuvash Republic
As of 2010, one rural locality in the Chuvash Republic bears this name:
Korovino, Chuvash Republic, a village in Anastasovskoye Rural Settlement of Poretsky District

Ivanovo Oblast
As of 2010, three rural localities in Ivanovo Oblast bear this name:
Korovino, Privolzhsky District, Ivanovo Oblast, a village in Privolzhsky District
Korovino, Shuysky District, Ivanovo Oblast, a village in Shuysky District
Korovino, Zavolzhsky District, Ivanovo Oblast, a village in Zavolzhsky District

Kaluga Oblast
As of 2010, one rural locality in Kaluga Oblast bears this name:
Korovino, Kaluga Oblast, a village in Meshchovsky District

Kirov Oblast
As of 2010, two rural localities in Kirov Oblast bear this name:
Korovino, Pizhansky District, Kirov Oblast, a village in Izhevsky Rural Okrug of Pizhansky District
Korovino, Podosinovsky District, Kirov Oblast, a village in Yakhrengsky Rural Okrug of Podosinovsky District

Kostroma Oblast
As of 2010, one rural locality in Kostroma Oblast bears this name:
Korovino, Kostroma Oblast, a village in Podvigalikhinskoye Settlement of Manturovsky District

Kursk Oblast
As of 2010, one rural locality in Kursk Oblast bears this name:
Korovino, Kursk Oblast, a village in Gorodnovsky Selsoviet of Zheleznogorsky District

Moscow Oblast
As of 2010, five rural localities in Moscow Oblast bear this name:
Korovino, Chekhovsky District, Moscow Oblast, a village in Stremilovskoye Rural Settlement of Chekhovsky District
Korovino, Mozhaysky District, Moscow Oblast, a village in Borisovskoye Rural Settlement of Mozhaysky District, Moscow Oblast
Korovino, Naro-Fominsky District, Moscow Oblast, a village in Volchenkovskoye Rural Settlement of Naro-Fominsky District
Korovino, Orekhovo-Zuyevsky District, Moscow Oblast, a village in Gorskoye Rural Settlement of Orekhovo-Zuyevsky District
Korovino, Serebryano-Prudsky District, Moscow Oblast, a village in Uzunovskoye Rural Settlement of Serebryano-Prudsky District

Nizhny Novgorod Oblast
As of 2010, five rural localities in Nizhny Novgorod Oblast bear this name:
Korovino, Bor, Nizhny Novgorod Oblast, a village in Lindovsky Selsoviet of the city of oblast significance of Bor
Korovino, Gorodetsky District, Nizhny Novgorod Oblast, a village in Smirkinsky Selsoviet of Gorodetsky District
Korovino, Kstovsky District, Nizhny Novgorod Oblast, a village in Chernyshikhinsky Selsoviet of Kstovsky District
Korovino, Pavlovsky District, Nizhny Novgorod Oblast, a village in Korovinsky Selsoviet of Pavlovsky District
Korovino, Sokolsky District, Nizhny Novgorod Oblast, a village in Loyminsky Selsoviet of Sokolsky District

Novgorod Oblast
As of 2010, one rural locality in Novgorod Oblast bears this name:
Korovino, Novgorod Oblast, a village in Laptevskoye Settlement of Pestovsky District

Orenburg Oblast
As of 2010, one rural locality in Orenburg Oblast bears this name:
Korovino, Orenburg Oblast, a selo in Korovinsky Selsoviet of Buguruslansky District

Perm Krai
As of 2010, two rural localities in Perm Krai bear this name:
Korovino, Dobryanka, Perm Krai, a village under the administrative jurisdiction of the city of krai significance of Dobryanka
Korovino, Kuyedinsky District, Perm Krai, a village in Kuyedinsky District

Smolensk Oblast
As of 2010, one rural locality in Smolensk Oblast bears this name:
Korovino, Smolensk Oblast, a village in Slobodskoye Rural Settlement of Monastyrshchinsky District

Tambov Oblast
As of 2010, two rural localities in Tambov Oblast bear this name:
Korovino, Bondarsky District, Tambov Oblast, a selo in Mitropolsky Selsoviet of Bondarsky District
Korovino, Znamensky District, Tambov Oblast, a settlement in Pokrovo-Marfinsky Selsoviet of Znamensky District

Tver Oblast
As of 2010, five rural localities in Tver Oblast bear this name:
Korovino, Belsky District, Tver Oblast, a village in Belsky District
Korovino (Dmitrovogorskoye Rural Settlement), Konakovsky District, Tver Oblast, a village in Konakovsky District; municipally, a part of Dmitrovogorskoye Rural Settlement of that district
Korovino (Yuryevo-Devichyevskoye Rural Settlement), Konakovsky District, Tver Oblast, a village in Konakovsky District; municipally, a part of Yuryevo-Devichyevskoye Rural Settlement of that district
Korovino, Rameshkovsky District, Tver Oblast, a village in Rameshkovsky District
Korovino, Zharkovsky District, Tver Oblast, a village in Zharkovsky District

Udmurt Republic
As of 2010, one rural locality in the Udmurt Republic bears this name:
Korovino, Udmurt Republic, a village in Serginsky Selsoviet of Balezinsky District

Ulyanovsk Oblast
As of 2010, one rural locality in Ulyanovsk Oblast bears this name:
Korovino, Ulyanovsk Oblast, a selo in Kalmayursky Rural Okrug of Cherdaklinsky District

Vladimir Oblast
As of 2010, three rural localities in Vladimir Oblast bear this name:
Korovino, Alexandrovsky District, Vladimir Oblast, a village in Alexandrovsky District
Korovino, Melenkovsky District, Vladimir Oblast, a selo in Melenkovsky District
Korovino, Vyaznikovsky District, Vladimir Oblast, a village in Vyaznikovsky District

Vologda Oblast
As of 2010, four rural localities in Vologda Oblast bear this name:
Korovino, Belozersky District, Vologda Oblast, a village in Bechevinsky Selsoviet of Belozersky District
Korovino, Ust-Kubinsky District, Vologda Oblast, a village in Ustyansky Selsoviet of Ust-Kubinsky District
Korovino, Vashkinsky District, Vologda Oblast, a village in Vasilyevsky Selsoviet of Vashkinsky District
Korovino, Verkhovazhsky District, Vologda Oblast, a village in Termengsky Selsoviet of Verkhovazhsky District

Yaroslavl Oblast
As of 2010, six rural localities in Yaroslavl Oblast bear this name:
Korovino, Seredskoy Rural Okrug, Danilovsky District, Yaroslavl Oblast, a village in Seredskoy Rural Okrug of Danilovsky District
Korovino, Zimenkovsky Rural Okrug, Danilovsky District, Yaroslavl Oblast, a village in Zimenkovsky Rural Okrug of Danilovsky District
Korovino, Myshkinsky District, Yaroslavl Oblast, a village in Okhotinsky Rural Okrug of Myshkinsky District
Korovino, Pereslavsky District, Yaroslavl Oblast, a village in Dobrilovsky Rural Okrug of Pereslavsky District
Korovino, Pervomaysky District, Yaroslavl Oblast, a village in Semenovsky Rural Okrug of Pervomaysky District
Korovino, Poshekhonsky District, Yaroslavl Oblast, a village in Beloselsky Rural Okrug of Poshekhonsky District